Pennsylvania Route 446 (PA 446) is an  state highway located in McKean County, Pennsylvania. The southern terminus is at Route 46 in the Keating Township neighborhood of Farmers Valley. The northern terminus is at the New York state line near Portville, New York. Route 446 is mountainous for most of its length and its only street designation is Main Street. PA 446 is part of a family of routes interconnected with PA 46. However, unlike several others, PA 446 does connect to its parent route and PA 346. 

PA 446 was assigned in 1928 and used to be part of U.S. Route 6 (US 6) and PA 7.

Route description

PA 446 begins at a fork with its parent route, PA 46 in the Farmers Valley community of Keating Township. At the base of a mountain, PA 446 passes through Farmers Valley and passes to the north of a landmark called Diegel Hollow, running parallel to a Western New York and Pennsylvania Railroad line. The highway curves around the base of a mountain north of Prospect Hill. The highway passes Moody Hollow, where it turns northward and crosses the railroad tracks. PA 446 enters Larabee, where it passes over the Allegheny River and the Buffalo Line railroad line, which is owned by Norfolk Southern and operated by the Western New York and Pennsylvania Railroad, before it intersects with the northern terminus of PA 155. 

PA 446 leaves Larabee soon afterward, becoming surrounding on both sides by mountains, with the river and railroad tracks to the west. Although across a range of peaks, PA 346 parallels to the west. As the highway edges towards the state line, it enters the borough of Eldred. Just north of the borough, PA 346, which was paralleling earlier, now terminates at PA 446. The highway curves around a mountain and begins to follow the Allegheny River and the Buffalo Line railroad tracks before crossing the railroad tracks at-grade immediately before the New York line. There it continues as NY 305.

History
PA 446 from Farmers Valley to Larabee used to be part of Pennsylvania Route 7, which was designated in 1925. The next year, PA 7 was assigned as U.S. Route 6 as well. PA 446 was assigned in 1928 from Larabee to the New York border. In 1930, PA 446 was extended to Farmers Valley to its current southern terminus at PA 46.

Major intersections

See also

References

External links

Pennsylvania Highways: PA 446

446
Transportation in McKean County, Pennsylvania
U.S. Route 6